Molefi Kete Asante (born Arthur Lee Smith Jr.; August 14, 1942) is an American professor and philosopher. He is a leading figure in the fields of African-American studies, African studies, and communication studies. He is currently a professor in the Department of Africology at Temple University, where he founded the PhD program in African-American Studies. He is president of the Molefi Kete Asante Institute for Afrocentric Studies.

Asante is known for his writings on Afrocentricity, a school of thought that has influenced the fields of sociology, intercultural communication, critical theory, political science, the history of Africa, and social work. He is the author of more than 66 books and the founding editor of the Journal of Black Studies. He is the father of author and filmmaker M. K. Asante.

Early life and education
Asante was born Arthur Lee Smith Jr. in Valdosta, Georgia, the fourth of sixteen children. His father, Arthur Lee Smith, worked in a peanut warehouse and then on the Georgia Southern Railroad; his mother worked as a domestic. During the summers Asante would return to Georgia to work in the tobacco and cotton fields in order to earn tuition for school. An aunt, Georgia Smith, influenced him to pursue his education; she gave him his first book, a collection of short stories by Charles Dickens.

Smith attended Nashville Christian Institute, a Church of Christ-founded boarding school for black students, in Nashville, Tennessee. There he earned his high school diploma in 1960. While still in high school, he became involved with the Civil Rights Movement, joining the Fisk University student march in Nashville.

After graduation, he initially enrolled in Southwestern Christian College of Terrell, Texas, another historically black institution with Church of Christ roots. There he met Nigerian Essien Essien, whose character and intelligence inspired Smith to learn more about Africa.

Smith received his B.A. from Oklahoma Christian College (now Oklahoma Christian University) in 1964. He did graduate work, earning his master's degree from Pepperdine University in 1965 with a thesis on Marshall Keeble, a black preacher in the Church of Christ. Smith earned his PhD from UCLA in 1968 in communication studies. He worked for a time at UCLA, becoming the director of the Center for Afro-American Studies. At the age of 30, he was appointed by the University at Buffalo as a full professor and head of the Department of Communication.

In 1976, Asante chose to make a legal name change because he considered "Arthur Lee Smith" a slave name.

Career
At the University at Buffalo, Asante advanced the ideas of international and intercultural communication; he wrote and published with colleagues, Handbook of Intercultural Communication, the first book in the field. Asante was elected president of the Society for Intercultural Education, Training and Research in 1976. His work in intercultural communication made him a leading trainer of doctoral students in the field. Asante has directed more than one hundred PhD dissertations.

Asante published his first study of the black movement, Rhetoric of Black Revolution, in 1969. Subsequently, he wrote Transracial Communication, to explain how race complicates human interaction in American society. Soon Asante changed his focus to African-American and African culture in communication, with attention to the nature of African-American oratorical style.

Asante wrote Afrocentricity: The Theory of Social Change (1980) to announce a break with the past, where African-Americans believed they were on the margins of Europe and did not have a sense of historical centrality. He wrote on the conflict between white cultural hegemony and the oppressed African culture, and on the lack of victorious consciousness among Africans, a theme found in his principal philosophical work, The Afrocentric Idea (1987). Additional works on Afrocentric theory included Kemet, Afrocentricity and Knowledge (1990), and An Afrocentric Manifesto (2007).

The Utne Reader identified Asante as one of the 100 leading thinkers in America, writing, "Asante is a genial, determined, and energetic cultural liberationist whose many books, including Afrocentricity and The Afrocentric Idea, articulate a powerful African-oriented pathway of thought, action, and cultural self-confidence for black Americans."

In 1986 Asante proposed the first doctoral program in African-American studies to the administration at Temple University. This program was approved, and the first class entered the doctorate in 1988. More than 500 applicants had sought admission to the graduate program. Temple became known as the leader among the African-American Studies departments; it was 10 years before the next doctoral program was introduced in this field, at the University of Massachusetts Amherst in 1997. Alumni from the Temple program are found in every continent, many nations, and many direct African American Studies programs at major universities.

Honors
 Given the regnal name of Nana Okru Asante Peasah and the chieftaincy title of Kyidomhene of the House of Tafo, Akyem Abuakwa, Ghana (1995)
 Given the chieftaincy title of the Wanadoo of Gao in the court of the Amiru (Paramount Chief) Hassimi Maiga of Songhai (2012)

Afrocentricity
According to The Oxford History of Historical Writing: Historical Writing Since 1945, Asante has "based his entire career on Afrocentricity, and continues to defend it in spite of strong criticisms".

In 1980 Asante published Afrocentricity: The Theory of Social Change, which initiated a discourse around the issue of African agency and subject place in historical and cultural phenomena. He maintained that Africans had been moved off-center in terms on most questions of identity, culture, and history. Afrocentricity sought to place Africans at the center of their own narratives and to reclaim the teaching of African-American history from where it had been marginalized by Europeans.

Asante's book The Afrocentric Idea was a more intellectual book about Afrocentricity than the earlier popular book. After the second edition of The Afrocentric Idea was released in 1998, Asante appeared as a guest on a number of television programs, including The Today Show, 60 Minutes, and the MacNeil-Lehrer News Hour, to discuss his ideas.

According to Asante's Afrocentric Manifesto, an Afrocentric project requires a minimum of five characteristics: (1) an interest in a psychological location, (2) a commitment to finding the African subject place, (3) the defense of African cultural elements, (4) a commitment to lexical refinement, and (5) a commitment to correct the dislocations in the history of Africa.

Selected bibliography
 “Revolutionary Pedagogy: A Primer for Teachers of Black Children” (Universal Write Publications|2019)
 “Being Human Being” (Universal Write Publications, 2022)
An Afrocentric Manifesto: Toward an African Renaissance (Polity, 2007), 
As I Run toward Africa: A Memoir (Paradigm Publishers, 2011), 
Cheikh Anta Diop: An Intellectual Portrait (Sankore Madrasah, 2007)
Contemporary Black Thought: Alternative Analyses in Social and Behavioral Science (Sage, 1980)
Contemporary Critical Thought in Africology and Africana Studies (Lexington Books, 2016) 
Contemporary Public Communication: Applications (Harper & Row, 1977)
Encyclopedia of African Religion (Sage, 2009)
Encyclopedia of Black Studies (Sage, 2004), 
Erasing Racism: The Survival of the American Nation (Prometheus, 2009, 2003)
Facing South to Africa: Toward an Afrocentric Critical Orientation (Lexington Books, 2014)
Handbook of Black Studies (Sage, 2006), 
Mass Communication: Principles and Practices (Macmillan, 1979)
Maulana Karenga: An Intellectual Portrait (Polity, 2009)
100 Greatest African Americans (Prometheus, 2002)
Socio-Cultural Conflict between African American and Korean American (University Press of America, 2000)
Spear Masters: An Introduction to African Religion (University Press of America, 2007), 
The African American People: A Global History (Routledge, 2012)
The Afrocentric Idea (Temple University Press, 1998, 1987)
The Painful Demise of Eurocentrism: An Afrocentric Response to Critics (Africa World Press, 1999), 
Transracial Communication (Prentice Hall, 1973),

References

External links

 Dr. Molefi Kete Asante – Official Web site
 Molefi Kete Asante Institute for Afrocentric Studies

1942 births
Living people
African-American social scientists
American social scientists
African-American writers
Afrocentrists
20th-century American philosophers
21st-century American philosophers
American non-fiction writers
Communication theorists
American pan-Africanists
Oklahoma Christian University alumni
Pepperdine University alumni
Political activists from Pennsylvania
Black studies scholars
University of California, Los Angeles alumni
Temple University faculty
People from Valdosta, Georgia
American academic administrators
African-American educators
University at Buffalo faculty
20th-century African-American people
21st-century African-American people
African diaspora studies scholars